

History
Callan was a constituency represented in the Irish House of Commons until 1800. It was established by royal charter in 1585, apparently at the request of Thomas Butler, 10th Earl of Ormond. He was a cousin of Elizabeth I on her mother's side, and one of the few Irish leaders in whom she had complete trust. It was very much a Butler "family borough", whose seats were held by families like the Comerfords, who were Butler clients.

In the Patriot Parliament of 1689 summoned by James II, Callan was represented with two members.

Members of Parliament, 1585–1801
1585 Gerald Comerford and Edward Brennan 
1613–1615 Pierce Hayden and William Rothe (died and replaced by Richard Forrestal) 
1634–1635 Edward Comerford and Lord Maltravers
1639–1649 Edward Comerford and Sir Thomas Wharton (resigned and replaced 1640 by Richard Bellings (expelled 1642))
1661–1666 John Campbell and Henry Baker (Baker died and replaced 1662 by Matthew Harrison)

1689–1801

Notes

References

Bibliography

Constituencies of the Parliament of Ireland (pre-1801)
Historic constituencies in County Kilkenny
1264 establishments in Ireland
1800 disestablishments in Ireland
Constituencies established in 1264
Constituencies disestablished in 1800